WW domain-binding protein 4 is a protein that in humans is encoded by the WBP4 gene.

This gene encodes WW domain-containing binding protein 4. The WW domain represents a small and compact globular structure that interacts with proline-rich ligands. This encoded protein is a general spliceosomal protein that may play a role in cross-intron bridging of U1 and U2 snRNPs in the spliceosomal complex A.

References

Further reading